WQRL (106.3 FM, "Q106.3") is a radio station licensed to Benton, Illinois, covering Southern Illinois, including Marion, Benton, and Harrisburg.  WQRL has a classic hits format and is owned by Dana Communications Corporation.

The station is an affiliate of the syndicated Pink Floyd program "Floydian Slip."

History

WQRX
The station began broadcasting October 1, 1973, and originally held the call sign WQRX. It had an ERP of 3,000 watts at a HAAT of 300 feet. The station was branded "The Golden Voice of Southern Illinois", and had a variety format. In 1975, the station began airing easy listening music during the day and progressive rock at night. By 1980, the station had begun airing a top 40 format.

WQRL
In 1982, the station's call sign was changed to WQRL, and the station adopted an adult contemporary format. In February 1993, the station's format was changed to country music, airing programming from Unistar's Hot Country network. In 1994, the station's ERP was increased to 12,500 watts, at a HAAT of 459 feet. In July 1996, the station adopted an oldies format, which lasted for more than 2 decades. When the 2020s rolled along, its oldies format tweaked into a classic hits format.

References

External links
WQRL's website

Classic hits radio stations in the United States
QRL
Companies based in Franklin County, Illinois
Radio stations established in 1973
1973 establishments in Illinois